Lauren Powley (born March 5, 1984) is an American field hockey player.

Biography

Early life and education
Lauren Powley was born March 5, 1984, in Kingston, Pennsylvania, to Penelope and Kenneth Powley. She grew up in Mountaintop, Pennsylvania, and graduated from Wyoming Seminary high school in Kingston, Pennsylvania, in 2002.

Field hockey career
Powley played collegiate field hockey for the Maryland Terrapins. She was co-captain of the team her senior year, which won the NCAA Women's Field Hockey Championship.

She has been a member of the United States women's national field hockey team since 2005 and has 37 international caps.  Prior to that, she and played on the junior squads in 2001 (under-18), 2002 (under-19), 2004 and 2005 (under-21). Powley competed in the 2008 Summer Olympic Games in Beijing, China as a member of the United States Field Hockey Team. The team earned a spot in the Olympic games after defeating Belgium in the Olympic Qualifier championship game on April 28, 2008.

In 2006, Powley biked across the United States with her father, Ken, to raise money for the U.S. field hockey team.

References

External links
 
USA Field Hockey - Athletes - Lauren Powley
Player Biography at University of Maryland Website

1984 births
Living people
American female field hockey players
Field hockey players at the 2008 Summer Olympics
Olympic field hockey players of the United States
Maryland Terrapins field hockey players
People from Kingston, Pennsylvania
Wyoming Seminary alumni